Arthur Gordon Bruce (May 9, 1919 – July 15, 1997) was a Canadian professional ice hockey forward who played 28 games in the National Hockey League for the Boston Bruins. He was born in Ottawa, Ontario.

During the 1940-41 season Boston Bruce was called up from the minors to play 7 regular season games. He was with the team during the playoffs, but did not play, so the Boston Bruins did not include his name on the Stanley Cup.

As a member of the Sudbury Wolves he helped Canada win the 1938 World Championships in Prague, Czechoslovakia by scoring 3 goals and 2 assist in 7 games.

Career statistics

Regular season and playoffs

International

External links
 
Obituary at LostHockey.com

1919 births
1997 deaths
Boston Bruins players
Canadian ice hockey forwards
Hershey Bears players
Ice hockey people from Ottawa
Stanley Cup champions
Canadian expatriates in the United States